This is a select bibliography of Post World War II books and journal articles about Martin Van Buren (December 5, 1782 – July 24, 1862), an American statesman who served as the eighth president of the United States from 1837 to 1841.  

He was a founder of the Democratic Party, and served in multiple offices from New York state, including governor, United States Senator, state attorney general, and state senator. Nationally he served under President Andrew Jackson as Minister to Great Britain, United States Secretary of State, and was elected as Vice President of the United States for Jackson's second term. He was elected as the 8th president of the United States in 1836, but lost his 1840 reelection bid to Whig Party nominee William Henry Harrison. Later in life, Van Buren emerged as an elder statesman and an important anti-slavery leader, who led the Free Soil Party ticket in the 1848 presidential election.

Books are published by scholarly presses or are reviewed favorably in academic journals. There have been relatively few full-length biographies written about Van Buren; however, works about events closely related to his presidency contain significant information about Van Buren. This bibliography includes a selection of Van Buren's papers and messages along with archival collections available online but does not include newspaper articles or pamphlets. The Further Reading section contains books with additional bibliographies on the life and career of Van Buren. This bibliography uses APA style citations.

Biographies
 Cole, Donald B. (1984). Martin Van Buren and the American Political System. Princeton, NJ: Princeton University Press.
 Curtis, James C. (1970). The Fox at Bay: Martin Van Buren and the Presidency, 1837–1841. Lexington, KY: University Press of Kentucky.
 Mushkat, Jerome, & Rayback, Joseph G. (1997). Martin Van Buren: Law, Politics and the Shaping of Republican Ideology. De Kalb, IL: Northern Illinois University Press.
 Niven, John. (1983). Martin Van Buren: The Romantic Age of American Politics. New York, NY: Oxford University Press.
 Remini, Robert V. (1959). Martin Van Buren and the Making of the Democratic Party. New York, NY: Columbia University Press.
 Silbey, Joel H. (2002). Martin Van Buren and the Emergence of American Popular Politics. New York, NY: Rowman & Littlefield.
 Widmer, Ted. (2005). Martin Van Buren: The American Presidents Series: The 8th President, 1837–1841. New York, NY: Times Books.
 Wilson, Major L. (1984). The Presidency of Martin Van Buren. Lawrence KS: University Press of Kansas.

Books with content about Van Buren
 Blue, Frederick J. (1973). The Free Soilers: Third Party Politics, 1848–54. Urbana, IL: University of Illinois Press.
 Brooke, John L. (2010). Chapter 7: Party and Corruption: The Columbia Junto and the Rise of Martin Van Buren, 1799–1812. In Columbia Rising: Civil Life on the Upper Hudson from the Revolution to the Age of Jackson. Chapel Hill, NC: The University of North Carolina Press.
 Bruegel, M. (2002). Farm, Shop, Landing: The Rise of a Market Society in the Hudson Valley, 1780–1860. Durham, NC.: Duke University Press.
 Cheathem, Mark R. The Coming of Democracy: Presidential Campaigning in the Age of Jackson (2018)
 Hofstadter, Richard. (1969). The Idea of a Party System. Berkeley, CA: University of California Press.
 Holt, Michael F. (1999). The Rise and Fall of the American Whig Party: Jacksonian Politics and the Onset of the Civil War. New York, NY: Oxford University Press.
 Howe, Daniel Walker. (2007). What Hath God Wrought: The Transformation of America, 1815–1848. New York, NY: Oxford University Press.
 Lepler, Jessica. M. (2013). The Many Panics of 1837: People, Politics, and the Creation of a Transatlantic Financial Crisis. Cambridge, UK: Cambridge University Press.
 Maury, S. (2009). Martin Van Buren. In The Statesmen of America in 1846. Cambridge Library Collection - North American History, pp. 114–139. Cambridge, UK: Cambridge University Press.
 McCormick, Richard P. (1966). The Second American Party System. Chapel Hill, NC: University of North Carolina Press.
 McGrane, Reginald C. (1966). The Panic of 1837: Some Financial Problems of the Jacksonian Era. Chicago, IL: University of Chicago Press.
 Merk, Frederick. (1972). Slavery and the Annexation of Texas. New York, NY: Knopf.
 Rediker, M. B. (2013). The Amistad Rebellion: An Atlantic Odyssey of Slavery and Freedom. London, UK: Verso.
 Richards, Leonard L. (2000). The Slave Power: The Free North and Southern Domination, 1780–1860. Baton Rouge, LA: Louisiana State University Press.
 Roberts, A. (2016). America's First Great Depression: Economic Crisis and Political Disorder after the Panic of 1837. Ithaca, NY: Cornell University Press.
 Schlesinger, Arthur M., Jr. (1953). The Age of Jackson. Boston, MA: Little, Brown and Company.
 Sellers, Charles G. (1992). The Market Revolution: Jacksonian America, 1815–1846. New York, NY: Oxford University Press.
 Temin, Peter. (1969). The Jacksonian Economy. New York, NY: Norton.
 Watson, Harry. L. (2006). Liberty and Power: The Politics of Jacksonian America. New York, NY: Hill and Wang.

Journal articles
 Adams, S. P. (2011). Hard Times, Loco-Focos, and Buckshot Wars: The Panic of 1837 in Pennsylvania. Pennsylvania Legacies, 11(1), pp. 12–17.
 Cayton, A. (1985). The Debate over the Panama Congress and the Origins of the Second American Party System. The Historian, 47(2), pp. 219–238.
 Curtis, J. (1981). In the Shadow of Old Hickory: The Political Travail of Martin Van Buren. Journal of the Early Republic, 1(3), pp. 249–267.
 Duncan, J. K. (2020). "Plain Catholics of the North": Martin Van Buren and the Politics of Religion, 1807–1836. U.S. Catholic Historian 38(1), pp. 25–48.
 Ford, T., & Weinberg, C. (2009). Slavery, Interracial Marriage, and the Election of 1836. OAH Magazine of History, 23(2), pp. 57–61.
 Friedenberg, A. (1914). The Correspondence of Jews with President Martin Van Buren. Publications of the American Jewish Historical Society, (22), pp. 71–100. 
 Harrison, J. (1956). Martin Van Buren and His Southern Supporters. The Journal of Southern History, 22(4), pp. 438–458.
 Hummel, J. (1999). Martin Van Buren: The Greatest American President. The Independent Review, 4(2), pp. 255–281. 
 Huston, R. (2004). The "Little Magician" after the Show: Martin Van Buren, Country Gentleman and Progressive Farmer, 1841–1862. New York History, 85(2), pp. 93–121.
 Kohan, C., & Van Buren, S. (1987). Martin Van Buren's Journey Home in 1839: An Account by his Son. New York History, 68(1), pp. 93–99.
 Kruman, M. (1992). The Second American Party System and the Transformation of Revolutionary Republicanism. Journal of the Early Republic, 12(4), pp. 509–537.
 Latner, R. (1978). The Kitchen Cabinet and Andrew Jackson's Advisory System. The Journal of American History, 65(2), pp. 367–388.
 McBride, S. (2016). When Joseph Smith Met Martin Van Buren: Mormonism and the Politics of Religious Liberty in Nineteenth-Century America. Church History, 85(1), pp. 150–158.
 Mintz, M. (1949). The Political Ideas of Martin Van Buren. New York History, 30(4), pp. 422–448.
 Morrison, M. (1995). Martin Van Buren, the Democracy, and the Partisan Politics of Texas Annexation. The Journal of Southern History, 61(4), pp. 695–724.
 Pasley, J. (2007). Minnows, Spies, and Aristocrats: The Social Crisis of Congress in the Age of Martin Van Buren. Journal of the Early Republic, 27(4), pp. 599–653.
 Rayback, J. G. (1954). Martin Van Buren's Desire for Revenge in the Campaign of 1848. The Mississippi Valley Historical Review, 40(4), pp. 707–716.
 ———. (1955). Martin Van Buren's Break with James K. Polk: The Record. New York History, 36(1), pp. 51–62.
 ——— (1980). A Myth Re-Examined: Martin van Buren's Role in the Presidential Election of 1816. Proceedings of the American Philosophical Society, 124(2), pp. 106–118. 
 ——— (1983). Martin Van Buren: His Place in the History of New York and the United States. New York History, 64(2), pp. 120–135.
 Remini, R. V. (1958). The Albany Regency. New York History, 39(4), pp. 341–355. 
 ———. (1958). Martin Van Buren and the Tariff of Abominations. The American Historical Review, 63(4), pp. 903–917.
 Ritcheson, C. (1986). Van Buren's Mission to London, 1831-1832. The International History Review, 8(2), pp. 190–213.
 Rolater, F. (1993). The American Indian and the Origin of the Second American Party System. The Wisconsin Magazine of History, 76(3), pp. 180–203.  
 Roper, D. (1982). Martin Van Buren as Tocqueville's Lawyer: The Jurisprudence of Politics. Journal of the Early Republic, 2(2), pp. 169–189.
 Rousseau, P. (2002). Jacksonian Monetary Policy, Specie Flows, and the Panic of 1837. The Journal of Economic History, 62(2), pp. 457–488.
 Shade, W. (1986). Politics and Parties in Jacksonian America. The Pennsylvania Magazine of History and Biography, 110(4), pp. 483–507.
 ———. (1998). "The Most Delicate and Exciting Topics": Martin Van Buren, Slavery, and the Election of 1836. Journal of the Early Republic, 18(3), pp. 459–484.
 Williams, W. (1965). Ten Letters From William Harris Crawford To Martin Van Buren. The Georgia Historical Quarterly, 49(1), pp. 65–81.
 ———. (1983). Lincoln and Van Buren in the Steps of the Fathers: Another Look at the Lyceum Address. Civil War History. 29(3), pp. 197–211.
 ———. (1988). Republicanism and the Idea of Party in the Jacksonian Period. Journal of the Early Republic, 8(4), pp. 419–442.

Books, papers, and speeches by Martin Van Buren

Collected Papers and Speeches
 The Papers of Martin Van Buren at Cumberland University
 The American Presidency Project - The Papers of Martin Van Buren (Online Collection) at University of California, Santa Barbara
 Richardson, J. D. (2010). Martin Van Buren: A Compilation Of The Messages And Papers Of The Presidents.  Whitefish, MT: Kessinger Publishing.

Individual Papers and Speeches
 March 4, 1837: Inaugural Address
 March 28, 1837: Proclamation 43C—Extinguishing Title for Indian Lands Between the State of Missouri and the Missouri River.
 June 27, 1837: State of Maine - Resolves Relative to the Northeastern Boundary.
 December 5, 1837: First Annual Message.
 January 5, 1838: Proclamation 45A—Neutrality With Respect to Canadian Affairs.
 November 21, 1838: Proclamation—Neutrality With Respect to Canadian Affairs.
 December 3, 1838: Second Annual Message.
 December 2, 1839: Third Annual Message.
 December 5, 1840: Fourth Annual Message.

Books by Van Buren
 Inquiry Into the Origin and Course of Political Parties in the United States.
 The Autobiography of Martin Van Buren.

Further reading
 Cole, Donald B. (2016). Bibliography. In Martin Van Buren and the American Political System. Princeton, NJ: Princeton University Press.
 Ward, John William 1955. Andrew Jackson, Symbol for an Age. New York: Oxford University Press.
 Widmer, Ted. (2005). Select Bibliography. In Martin Van Buren: The American Presidents Series: The 8th President, 1837–1841. New York, NY: Times Books.
 Wise, W. H., & Cronin, J. W., (Eds.). (2010). A Bibliography Of Andrew Jackson And Martin Van Buren. Whitefish, MT: Kessinger Publishing.

See also
 Family of Martin Van Buren
 Presidency of Andrew Jackson
 1832 Democratic National Convention
 1832 United States presidential election
 1835 Democratic National Convention
 1836 United States presidential election
 Presidency of Martin Van Buren
 Panic of 1837
 United States v. The Amistad
 1840 Democratic National Convention
 1840 United States presidential election

Notes

References

External links
 White House Biography
 American President: Martin Van Buren (1782–1862). From the Miller Center of Public Affairs, The University of Virginia
 Martin Van Buren National Historic Site (Lindenwald), National Park Service

Bibliographies of presidents of the United States
Books about politics of the United States
Bibliographies of people
Political bibliographies
Works about presidents of the United States
Bibliography